Ebenezer Coker (?-1783) was an English silversmith. He began his career in 1738. One of his chamber candlesticks is held at the Metropolitan Museum of Art. Four of his candlesticks were sold for $15,000 at a 2012 Christie's auction.

References

1783 deaths
English silversmiths